Verseg is a village in Pest County,  Central Hungary Region, Hungary.

Populated places in Pest County